I Yabba-Dabba Do! is a 1993 American animated made-for-television film based on the 1960s animated series, The Flintstones and is a continuation of the series’ spin-off,The Pebbles and Bamm-Bamm Show. It premiered on ABC on February 7, 1993.

Plot
Pebbles, who now works for an ad agency and Bamm-Bamm, who works in a car repair shop, decide to get married after Bamm-Bamm proposes with a poem, in the middle of the street (after Pebbles mistakenly thinks he was trying to dump her when Bamm-Bamm read her a letter that started "Dear Pebbles"). However, Fred loses the family savings when he bet it on his team, the Bedrock Brontos. Fred tries asking for a raise from Mr. Slate, but is dismissed from his job because of his violent temper.

Fred enlists Barney's help in bringing more money for the wedding, but they fail, losing Barney's money to a real estate con artist and becoming more in debt than before. Meanwhile, Wilma's mother Pearl Slaghoople arrives to help with the wedding. Pebbles and Bamm-Bamm decide to elope in Rock Vegas because of their parents' arguing and fighting. Wilma and Betty discover the truth about Fred and Wilma's nest egg, and Fred is forced out of the house. After seeing that even Dino’s mad at him, Fred finally realizes the error of his ways and decides to fix his mistakes. Reconciling with Barney, Wilma, Betty and Pearl, Fred asks Barney to help search for Pebbles and Bamm-Bamm.

Fred and Barney travel to Rock Vegas looking for Pebbles and Bamm-Bamm. They stop at a casino where Barney wins more money. They are attacked by the Wedding Whackers gang after mistaking them for Pebbles and Bamm-Bamm getting married and took a photo of them robbing a newlywed couple. Shortly afterwards they are rescued by Pebbles and Bamm-Bamm. During the chase, the photo of the Wedding Whackers is destroyed, so the four are captured as suspects of being the marriage whackers, along with the real marriage whackers.

While in detainment, Fred reveals all the trouble he has gone through to try to help Pebbles with her wedding ceremony which leads the marriage whackers to reveal to their crimes, to the dismay of the Whackers' mother. Since Barney made a lot of money on his casino wins on the big wheel, they can use it to pay for the wedding, replace their nest eggs and pay off their debts. Fred, Barney, Pebbles and Bamm-Bamm finally reunite with Wilma, Betty and the others. Mr. Slate rehires Fred, and Pebbles and Bamm-Bamm get married, with Fred, Barney, Dino, Wilma and Betty as the happy ones seeing them getting married. Fred gets his job back from Mr Slate and is given a raise after being invited to the wedding. At the end, Pebbles and Bamm-Bamm reveal they are moving to Hollyrock with Barney paying their way with his share of the Rock Vegas winnings, at which Fred gets angry with Barney and they start to fight again.

Voice cast
 Henry Corden as Fred Flintstone
 Frank Welker as Barney Rubble and Dino
 Jean Vander Pyl as Wilma Flintstone and Martha Slate
 B.J. Ward as Betty Rubble
 Janet Waldo as Pearl Slaghoople & Additional Voices
 Megan Mullally as Pebbles Flintstone-Rubble
 Jerry Houser as Bamm-Bamm Rubble
 John Stephenson as Mr. Slate
 Joseph Barbera as Himself
 William Hanna as Himself
  Darryl Phinnessee as Wedding Reception Singer/Piano Player singing "I Yabba Dabba Do"
  Randy Crenshaw as The Lodge Patron #2, The Mammoth
 Henry Polic II as the Seagull Writer

Nielsen ratings
The film brought in a 12.4/19 rating/share in its original airing and was watched by 22 million viewers. The film came in second place in its timeslot, and ranking 35th out of 94 programs that week.

Home media
Cartoon Network, with association with Turner Home Video, released the movie on VHS on January 14, 1997. Then Warner Home Video released it on April 21, 1998, and again in 1999 and 2000, but they are now out of print. On October 9, 2012, Warner Archive released The Flintstones- I Yabba-Dabba Do! on DVD in region 1 as part of their Hanna–Barbera Classics Collection.  This is a Manufacture-on-Demand (MOD) release, available through Warner's online store, Amazon.com and Wal-Mart.com.

On August 4, 2020, Warner Bros. Home Entertainment gave it its first wide release as part of the DVD collection The Flintstones: 2 Movies & 5 Specials.

Syndication
This spinoff movie has aired on Cartoon Network in the 1990s, then ran on Boomerang in the 2000s. It is now available on the Boomerang app, alongside A Flintstone Family Christmas and other Flintstones spin-offs, with the exception of the sequel Hollyrock-a-Bye Baby.

Sequel
Hollyrock-a-Bye Baby was released in 1993. The sequel is considered very difficult to syndicate after its original broadcast and the attempt of releasing it on home media was delayed until 2012 mainly due to the involved suggestive material relating to child birth. However, it has eventually aired on Cartoon Network and Boomerang usually as part of Mother's Day special programming in the early 2000s until it never ran again.

References

External links

 
 

1993 television films
1993 animated films
1993 films
1990s American animated films
The Flintstones films
Hanna-Barbera animated films
Films based on television series
Animated films based on animated series
American television films
Films about weddings
American animated comedy films
Films scored by John Debney
Television films based on television series
Films directed by William Hanna